Death and Wikipedia includes all discussions of how Wikipedia editors present death of public figures. 

Wikipedia contains user-generated content, and the Wikipedia community updates Wikipedia articles with information about deaths quickly after people die. The Wikipedia articles of recently deceased people often have large spikes in views. For example, the article for designer Kate Spade averaged 2117 views in the 48 hours before her death. In the 48 hours after her death, however, it got 3,417,416, an increase of 161,427%.

The media has remarked on the site's quick response in updating biographies after the deaths of celebrities such as Michael Jackson and Elizabeth II.

In 2009 the Wikipedia community adopted new quality control measures to verify information on the biographies of living people, including claims of death.

When a celebrity dies of a disease, then readers may also read about that disease in Wikipedia.

See also
Deaths in 2022

References

Death customs
Wikipedia content